Lasionycta impar is a moth of the family Noctuidae. It is found in southern Russia.

External links
Fauna Europaea

Lasionycta
Moths described in 1870